Viù is a comune (municipality) in the Metropolitan City of Turin in the Italian region Piedmont, located about  northwest of Turin.

Viù's central square used to feature a wooden statue of Pinocchio, which is 6.53 meters tall and weighs about 4000 kilograms  however that has now been removed.

Sightseeing 

 One of the most beautiful historical villas is Villa Franchetti. The villa was built in 1861 by the Baron Raimondo Franchetti in Swiss chalet style. Several notable people have stayed in the villa including Giacomo Puccini who has been told to having composed part of La bohème within its walls. Amongst other notable personalities the Prince of Piedmont Umberto II of Italy and the infamous Third Reich minister Hermann Göring stayed at the villa. 
20 minutes away from Viù you will find the Devil's Bridge, located in the near village of Lanzo Torinese

References

External links 

 Comune di Viù official site

Cities and towns in Piedmont
Canavese